The Israel men's national 3x3 team is a national basketball team of Israel, administered by the Israel Basketball Association.
It represents the country in international 3x3 (3 against 3) basketball competitions.

See also
Israel national basketball team
Israel women's national 3x3 team

References

Basketball in Israel
Basketball teams in Israel
Men's national 3x3 basketball teams
3